Mount Newman is a mountain rising to about 1,150 m in northeast Havre Mountains, north Alexander Island, Antarctica. Situated 13.23 km south of Satovcha Peak, 13.15 km north-northwest of Breze Peak, 8.26 km northeast of Mount Pontida and 7.34 km east-northeast of Igralishte Peak. The mountain was first surveyed by the British Antarctic Survey (BAS), 1975–76. Named by United Kingdom Antarctic Place-Names Committee (UK-APC) in 1980 after John Newman, BAS Diesel mechanic, Adelaide, 1968–69; Stonington Island, 1969–70 and 1972–74; who was instrumental in modifying BAS motor sledges, first used successfully as replacements for dog teams on this survey.

See also 

 Mount McArthur
 Mount Nicholas
 Mount Sanderson

External links 
 Mount Newman Copernix satellite image

References 

Mountains of Alexander Island